The 2017 Wimbledon Championships are described below in detail, in the form of day-by-day summaries.

Day 1 (3 July)
Seeds out:
Gentlemen's Singles:  Stan Wawrinka [5],  Nick Kyrgios [20],  Ivo Karlović [21],  Fernando Verdasco [31]
Ladies' Singles:  Mirjana Lučić-Baroni [26],  Roberta Vinci [31]
Schedule of play

Day 2 (4 July)
Seeds out:
Gentlemen's Singles:  Feliciano López [19],  Richard Gasquet [22]
Ladies' Singles:  Anastasia Pavlyuchenkova [16],  Daria Gavrilova [20],  Kiki Bertens [23],  Lauren Davis [28],  Zhang Shuai [30]
Schedule of play

Day 3 (5 July)
Seeds out:
Gentlemen's Singles:  Lucas Pouille [14]
Ladies' Singles:  Petra Kvitová [11],  Elena Vesnina [15],  Madison Keys [17],  Anastasija Sevastova [18],  Barbora Strýcová [22],  Carla Suárez Navarro [25]
Gentlemen's Doubles:  Jean-Julien Rojer /  Horia Tecău [9],  Feliciano López /  Marc López [11]
Ladies' Doubles:  Gabriela Dabrowski /  Xu Yifan [10],  Eri Hozumi /  Miyu Kato [16]
Schedule of play

Day 4 (6 July)
Seeds out:
Gentlemen's Singles:  Jack Sock [17],  John Isner [23],  Juan Martín del Potro [29],  Paolo Lorenzi [32]
Ladies' Singles:  Karolína Plíšková [3],  Kristina Mladenovic [12],  Daria Kasatkina [29],  Lucie Šafářová [32]
Ladies' Doubles:  Abigail Spears /  Katarina Srebotnik [6],  Raquel Atawo /  Jeļena Ostapenko [11],  Kiki Bertens /  Johanna Larsson [14]	
Schedule of play

Day 5 (7 July)
Seeds out:
Gentlemen's Singles:  Kei Nishikori [9],  Steve Johnson [26],  Fabio Fognini [28],  Karen Khachanov [30]
Ladies' Singles:  Dominika Cibulková [8]
Gentlemen's Doubles:  Jamie Murray /  Bruno Soares [3],  Rohan Bopanna /  Édouard Roger-Vasselin [8],  Juan Sebastián Cabal /  Robert Farah [12],  Fabrice Martin /  Daniel Nestor [13],  Julio Peralta /  Horacio Zeballos [15]
Ladies' Doubles:  Bethanie Mattek-Sands /  Lucie Šafářová [1] (withdrew due to Mattek-Sands' knee injury)	
Schedule of play

Day 6 (8 July)
Seeds out:
Gentlemen's Singles:  Jo-Wilfried Tsonga [12],  Gaël Monfils [15],  Albert Ramos Viñolas [25],  Mischa Zverev [27]
Ladies' Singles:  Timea Bacsinszky [19]
Gentlemen's Doubles:  Pierre-Hugues Herbert /  Nicolas Mahut [2],  Bob Bryan /  Mike Bryan [5]
Mixed Doubles:  Édouard Roger-Vasselin /  Andrea Hlaváčková [5],  Rajeev Ram /  Casey Dellacqua [6],  Jean-Julien Rojer /  Chan Hao-ching [8],  Aisam-ul-Haq Qureshi /  Anna-Lena Grönefeld [13],  Marcin Matkowski /  Květa Peschke [14]	
Schedule of play

Middle Sunday (9 July)
Following tradition, Middle Sunday is a day of rest and no matches are played.

Day 7 (10 July)
Seeds out:
Gentlemen's Singles:  Rafael Nadal [4],  Dominic Thiem [8],  Alexander Zverev [10],  Grigor Dimitrov [13],  Roberto Bautista Agut [18]
Ladies' Singles:  Angelique Kerber [1],  Elina Svitolina [4],  Caroline Wozniacki [5],  Agnieszka Radwańska [9],  Caroline Garcia [21],  Ana Konjuh [27]
Gentlemen's Doubles:  Ivan Dodig /  Marcel Granollers [6],  Raven Klaasen /  Rajeev Ram [7],  Florin Mergea /  Aisam-ul-Haq Qureshi [14]
Ladies' Doubles:  Tímea Babos /  Andrea Hlaváčková [4],  Lucie Hradecká /  Kateřina Siniaková [5],  Julia Görges /  Barbora Strýcová [7],  Kirsten Flipkens /  Sania Mirza [13],  Andreja Klepač /  María José Martínez Sánchez [15]
Mixed Doubles:  Łukasz Kubot /  Chan Yung-jan [3],  Raven Klaasen /  Katarina Srebotnik [7]		
Schedule of play

Day 8 (11 July)
Seeds out:
Ladies' Singles:   Simona Halep [2],  Svetlana Kuznetsova [7],  Jeļena Ostapenko [13],  Coco Vandeweghe [24]
Mixed Doubles:  Roman Jebavý /  Lucie Hradecká [16]		
Schedule of play

Day 9 (12 July)
Seeds out:
Gentlemen's Singles:  Andy Murray [1],  Novak Djokovic [2],  Milos Raonic [6],  Gilles Müller [16]
Gentlemen's Doubles:  Ryan Harrison /  Michael Venus [10]
Ladies' Doubles:  Chan Yung-jan [3] /  Martina Hingis [3],  Ashleigh Barty /  Casey Dellacqua [8]
Mixed Doubles:  Ivan Dodig /  Sania Mirza [4],  Juan Sebastián Cabal /  Abigail Spears [9].  Daniel Nestor /  Andreja Klepač [11],  Max Mirnyi /  Ekaterina Makarova [12],  Michael Venus /  Barbora Krejčíková [15]		
Schedule of play

Day 10 (13 July)
Seeds out:
Ladies' Singles:  Johanna Konta [6]
Gentlemen's Doubles:  Henri Kontinen /  John Peers [1]
Mixed Doubles:  Rohan Bopanna /  Gabriela Dabrowski [10]	
Schedule of play

Day 11 (14 July)
Seeds out:
Gentlemen's Singles:  Tomáš Berdych [11],  Sam Querrey [24]
Ladies' Doubles:  Anna-Lena Grönefeld /  Květa Peschke [12]
Mixed Doubles:  Bruno Soares [2] /  Elena Vesnina [2]		
Schedule of play

Day 12 (15 July)
Seeds out:
Ladies' Singles:  Venus Williams [10]	
Gentlemen's' Doubles:  Oliver Marach /  Mate Pavić [16]
Ladies' Doubles:  Chan Hao-ching /  Monica Niculescu [9]
Schedule of play

Day 13 (16 July)
Seeds out:
Gentlemen's Singles:  Marin Čilić [7]	
Schedule of play

References

Wimbledon Championships by year – Day-by-day summaries